Fort Langley-Aldergrove was a provincial electoral district for the Legislative Assembly of British Columbia, Canada. It was created for the 1991 election from the dual member Langley riding and abolished in 2017 into Langley East, Abbotsford South and Abbotsford West.

Demographics

Electoral history 

|-

 
|NDP
|Gail Chaddock-Costello
|align="right"|7,492
|align="right"|30.23
|align="right"|

|- bgcolor="white"
!align="left" colspan=3|Total
!align="right"|24,783
!align="right"|100.00%
!align="right"|
|}

|-

|-
 
|NDP
|Shane Dyson
|align="right"|7,597
|align="right"|29.07%
|align="right"|

|- bgcolor="white"
!align="left" colspan=3|Total
!align="right"|26,137
!align="right"|100.00%
!align="right"|

|-

|-

 
|NDP
|Simon Challenger
|align="right"|2,619
|align="right"|10.82%
|align="right"|
|align="right"|$11,421

|Independent
|Murray Dunbar
|align="right"|336
|align="right"|1.39%
|align="right"|
|align="right"|$977

|-

|-
 
|NDP
|Charles Bradford
|align="right"|7,369
|align="right"|29.03%
|align="right"|
|align="right"|$15,814

External links 
BC Stats - 2001 (pdf)
Results of 2001 election (pdf)
2001 Expenditures (pdf)
Results of 1996 election
1996 Expenditures (pdf)
Results of 1991 election
1991 Expenditures
Website of the Legislative Assembly of British Columbia

British Columbia provincial electoral districts
Langley, British Columbia (district municipality)
Provincial electoral districts in Greater Vancouver and the Fraser Valley